Foremark is a civil parish in the South Derbyshire district of Derbyshire, England. The parish contains twelve listed buildings that are recorded in the National Heritage List for England. Of these, two are listed at Grade I, the highest of the three grades, one is at Grade II*, the middle grade, and the others are at Grade II, the lowest grade.  The parish contains the village of Foremark and the surrounding area.  The most important buildings in the parish are St Saviour's Church and Foremark Hall, which are both listed at Grade I, and most of the other listed buildings in the parish are associated with them.  The other listed building is Anchor Church, a natural cave that has been converted for other purposes.


Key

Buildings

References

Citations

Sources

 

Lists of listed buildings in Derbyshire